The FINA Synchronised Swimming World Cup is an international, synchronized swimming event organized by FINA and currently held every 4 years. It is a top-level international 'synchro' competition. It was first held in 1979, and 2010 saw its twelfth edition.

The event features competition in four different synchro events (Solo, Duet, Team and Free Combination), and allows each entered nation to have 1 entrant per event. The winner of the event is determined by adding a nations points from the four events. (Note: Free Combination was added to the event beginning in 2006.)

As of 2012, Canada, Japan and the USA are the only nations to have swum at all editions of the Cup.

Editions

Event codes: S= Solo, D= Duet, T= Team, FC= Free Combination, TH= Team Highlights

References

Synchronised swimming competitions
Recurring sporting events established in 1979